Lingeer Ngoné Dièye (Serer: Lingeer Ngoone Jaay, or Lingeer Ngoneh Jaay) was a Lingeer from the Serer Kingdom of Saloum, and early ancestor of the Guedj (Wolof: Géej; Serer: Geej) maternal dynasty of Cayor and Baol. She was the wife of the 17th century present day Senegalese noble and Teigne Thié Yasin Demba Noudj Fall, and mother of the controversial Damel—Teigne Lat Soukabé Ngoné Fall ( fr ) who ruled as King of Cayor and Baol from 1697 to 1719 and became the first Guedj to rule in those kingdoms—after overthrowing the reigning maternal dynasty and installing his mother's matriclan. In usurping the throne, he committed fratricide by killing his paternal half-brother (the reigning king) and took his throne. Ngoné Dièye was a Serer noble of the Dièye family of Saloum.  In the Wolof Kingdom of Cayor, she became Queen when she married the King of Cayor, and later Queen Mother of Cayor and Baol when her son usurped the throne and unified Cayor and Baol. According to Cheikh Anta Diop, "The Guedj come from common people. They are distinguished by their adaptive ability and their military genius. The dynasty is named for the country of origin of the first founding Damel's mother. She was a commoner from the seacoast, who married the King; guedj meaning "sea" in Wolof. Her son, though he had no right to the throne, succeeded in being crowned, through his energy and mental agility."

In 1697, the newly appointed French Director General of Trade in Senegal, André Brue, established a cordial relationship with Lingeer Ngoné Dièye. The Queen Mother regarded André as young enough to be her son, and referred to him as such. In one of her secret correspondences with André, she mediated between her own son (Lat Soukabé) and the French, and asked the French to ignore her son's ourbursts and insults. The Queen Mother intervened regularly during the reign of her son in an attempts to curb his excesses with the French. 

Lingeer Ngoné Dièye is the matriarch and direct maternal ancestor of all the Guedj kings of Cayor and Baol, including the Senegalese hero Lat Dior. For several centuries until the French conquest of Baol and Cayor, Lingeer Ngoné Dièye's descendants dominated the political scene of Cayor and Baol.

See also
 Lingeer Fatim Beye
 Lingeer Ndoye Demba
 Ndaté Yalla Mbodj
 Njembot Mbodj
 Serer maternal clans
 Joos Maternal Dynasty
 Joof family
 Faye family

References

Bibliography
IFAN (1976), Bulletin de l'Institut français d'Afrique noire: Sciences humaines, Volume 38, p. 480
Diome, Fatou, Les Veilleurs de Sangomar, Albin Michel (2019), p. 153,   (retrieved February 28, 2020)
Buschinger, Danielle, (ed: Jan Willem Kloos; trans: Jan Willem Kloos), pp. 45-46, 51, Van den vos Reynaerde: mittelniederländisch - neuhochdeutsch, Presses du Centre d'Etudes médiévales Université de Picardie (1992), 
Thomas, Douglas H., Sufism, Mahdism and Nationalism: Limamou Laye and the Layennes of Senegal, Bloomsbury Publishing (2012), p. 60,   (retrieved February 28, 2020)
Diop, Cheikh Anta, Precolonial Black Africa, (trans. Harold Salemson), Chicago Review Press (1988), p. 150,   (retrieved February 28, 2020)
Labat, Jean-Baptiste, Nouvele Relation de l’Afrique Occidentale, (Paris: Guilliame Cavelier, 1728), p. 146.
Fall, R., (1997), Les souverains sénégambiens et la traite négrièrè: Lat Sukaabe Ngoné Dièye et André Brue, p. 11
Anta, Babou Cheikh, Le Jihad de l'âme. Ahmadou Bamba et la fondation de la Mouridiyya au Sénégal (1853-1913), KARTHALA Editions (2011), p. 59,   (retrieved February 28, 2020)

Further reading
 Histoire du Sénégal du xve siècle à 1870 de Prosper Cultru - Edition 1910 , 

Women rulers in Africa
Serer royalty
Serer matriarchs
Matriarchy
Queens regnant in Africa
Lingeer
Senegalese women in politics
17th-century women rulers
History of Senegal